Fivemile Rock is a small nunatak,  high, rising just northwest of Mineral Hill on Tabarin Peninsula, Antarctica.

References 

Rock formations of the Trinity Peninsula